Steven Hillel Paikin  (born June 9, 1960) is a Canadian journalist, author, and documentary producer. Paikin has primarily worked for TVOntario (TVO), Ontario's public broadcaster, and is anchor of TVO's flagship current affairs program The Agenda with Steve Paikin.

Early life and education
A native of Hamilton, Ontario, Paikin was born to Lawrence Sidney (Larry) Paikin, a manufacturer and owner of Ennis-Paikin Steel Ltd., and Marina Suzanne (Marnie) Sibulash. Marnie Paikin was invested a Member of the Order of Canada in 1999 for her work in education and health policy. She was also chair of Atomic Energy of Canada Limited and of the Ontario Council on University Affairs. Paikin is Jewish.

Paikin graduated from Hillfield Strathallan College in 1978 and continued to university where he received a Bachelor of Arts degree from the University of Toronto (Victoria University, Toronto 1981). Later, Paikin received his master's degree in broadcast journalism from Boston University. He served as sports editor for the University of Toronto's independent weekly, The Newspaper, while pursuing his BA, and was the play-by-play voice of the Varsity Blues hockey and football teams on U of T Radio.

Career
Paikin was an anchor and Queen's Park correspondent for CBC Television's Toronto station CBLT-TV, and host of a daily news and current affairs program on CBC Newsworld. He also held reporting jobs in private radio and print media, including the Hamilton Spectator and Toronto radio station CHFI, where he was Toronto City Hall reporter from 1982–85.

In 1992, Paikin began work at TVO, hosting the political series Between the Lines until 1994. He also co-created the Queen's Park magazine Fourth Reading, which he hosted for 14 years. In 1994, Paikin began co-hosting duties (with Mary Hynes for two years, and then Paula Todd) on Studio 2 until 2006. In 1998, he co-created and began hosting Diplomatic Immunity, a weekly foreign affairs commentary show.

In 2006, TVO cancelled Studio 2 and replaced it with a new program, The Agenda with Steve Paikin. Paikin frequently is selected to be the moderator of election debates. He acted as a moderator for federal leaders debates in 2006, 2008, and 2011; and for Ontario provincial leaders debates in 2007, 2011, 2014, 2018 and 2022.

Aside from his hosting and journalistic endeavors, Paikin has produced a number of feature-length documentaries: Return to the Warsaw Ghetto; A Main Street Man; Balkan Madness; Teachers, Tories and Turmoil; and Chairman of the Board: The Life and Death of John Robarts. For 1993's Return to the Warsaw Ghetto, Paikin won the "Silver Screen Award" at the U.S. International Film and Video Festival, and received awards at the Yorkton Film Festival in Saskatchewan and at China's Shanghai Film Festival.

In February 2012, Paikin was named the Queen's Park journalist with the most Twitter influence in a study conducted by PR agency Hill+Knowlton Strategies.

He holds honorary doctorates from McMaster University, Victoria University, Laurentian University, York University,  and honorary diplomas from Humber College, Centennial College, Mohawk College and Fanshawe College. He was later appointed chancellor of Laurentian University in Sudbury in October 2013, a position which was terminated following the university's restructuring amidst financial difficulties in 2021. In December 2013, he was made an Officer of the Order of Canada and invested into the Order of Ontario.

Personal life
Paikin is married to Canadian health care lobbyist Francesca Grosso, author of Navigating Canada's Health Care System and a former director of policy for then-Ontario health minister Tony Clement. Grosso was subsequently health policy advisor to Progressive Conservative Party of Ontario leader Patrick Brown and was the ghostwriter of his memoirs.
 
One of his sons, Zach Paikin, is a former Liberal Party activist. Another son, Henry Paikin, works for Senator Frances Lankin.

He is a cousin to the late Dr. Harry Paikin, a Hamilton school trustee for 30 years who was a Labor-Progressive Party candidate for the Ontario legislature in the 1945 Ontario election. Another cousin, Carol Paikin Miller, is a Hamilton school trustee and married to former NDP MPP Paul Miller.

Steve Paikin is a supporter of the Toronto Maple Leafs, Boston Red Sox, and Hamilton Tiger-Cats.

Publications
 The Life: The Seductive Call of Politics (Toronto: Viking Canada, 2001)
 The Dark Side: The Personal Price of a Political Life (Toronto: Viking Canada, 2003)
 Public Triumph, Private Tragedy: The Double Life of John P. Robarts (Toronto: Viking Canada, 2005)
 The New Game: How Hockey Saved Itself (Toronto: Viking Canada, 2007)
 Paikin and the Premiers: Personal Reflections on a Half Century of Ontario Leaders (Toronto: Dundurn Press, 2013)
 I am a Victor: The Mordechai Ronen Story by Mordechai Ronen with Steve Paikin (Toronto: Dundurn Press, 2015).
 Bill Davis: Nation Builder, and Not So Bland After All (Toronto: Dundurn Press, 2016)
 Introduction to Without Walls or Barriers: The Speeches of Premier David Peterson by Arthur Milnes and Ryan Zade (McGill-Queen's University Press, 2017)

References

External links

 Steve Paikin archives at the Clara Thomas Archives and Special Collections, York University Libraries, Toronto, Ontario
 
 TV Ontario: Steve Paikin has a stellar year, by Lisa de Wilde, March 27, 2014
 Audio interview: Steve Paikin on his Robarts biography: 30 May 2005
 Audio interview: Steve Paikin on moderating the 2006 leaders debate: 12 January 2006
 Queen's Park Twitter Influencers
 

Living people
Canadian biographers
Canadian male non-fiction writers
Male biographers
Canadian documentary film producers
21st-century Canadian non-fiction writers
Canadian television news anchors
Writers from Hamilton, Ontario
University of Toronto alumni
1960 births
Canadian university and college chancellors
Boston University College of Communication alumni
Officers of the Order of Canada
Members of the Order of Ontario
Canadian bloggers
Canadian television producers
Male bloggers
Jewish Canadian journalists
Jewish Canadian filmmakers
21st-century Canadian male writers
Film producers from Ontario